Rhacodactylus is a genus of medium to large geckos of the family Diplodactylidae.  All species in this genus are found on the islands that make up New Caledonia.

Genus characteristics include long limbs and toes with well-developed lamellae. Some webbing occurs on the hind limbs and toes.  Rhacodactylus possess prehensile tails which also have lamellae to assist in climbing.  These are for the most part arboreal geckos.  Rhacodactylus are nocturnal geckos.

The species are egg layers with the exception of Rhacodactylus trachyrhynchus and R. trachycephalus which gives live birth, a characteristic only otherwise found in New Zealand geckos. They also feed on lizards, more so than any of the family. Rhacodactylus geckos are sexually dimorphic, with the males possessing larger preanal pores than the females as well as a distinct hemipenis pocket.

Males tend to be stockier than females with the exception of R. auriculatus in which species the males are much slimmer than the females.

Classification

Gargoyle gecko, Rhacodactylus auriculatus 
New Caledonian giant gecko, Rhacodactylus leachianus
Rhacodactylus leachianus aubrianus
Rhacodactylus leachianus henkeli 
Rhacodactylus leachianus leachianus  
Greater rough-snouted giant gecko, Rhacodactylus trachyrhynchus
Lesser rough-snouted giant gecko, Rhacodactylus trachycephalus

A revision of the giant geckos of New Caldonia found weak support for inclusion of some taxa allied to this genus, and these have been assigned to new combinations: 
 Correlophus ciliatus, crested gecko; formerly R. ciliatus
 Correlophus sarasinorum; formerly R. sarasinorum
 Mniarogekko chahoua; formerly R. chahoua

Captivity
The species are regarded as charismatic and popular with herpetologists. Details of the behaviour of these geckos in captivity, contrasted with a paucity of field observations, has produced extensive literature on the genus.

References

Literature
 Bauer AM, Jackman TR, Sadlier RA, Whitaker AH. (2012). Revision of the giant geckos of New Caledonia (Reptilia: Diplodactylidae: Rhacodactylus). Zootaxa 3404: 1–52.
 Fitzinger L. (1843). Systema Reptilium, Fasciculus Primus, Amblyglossae. Vienna: Braumüller & Seidel. 106 pp. + indices. (Genus Rhacodactylus, p. 100).
 Seipp, Robert; Henkel, Friedrich Wilhelm. (2000). Rhacodactylus - Biologie, Haltung und Zucht; mit einem farbigen Anhang weiterer Geckoarten Neukaledoniens. Frankfurt am Main: Edition Chimaira. 173 pp. .
 de Vosjoli, Phillippe; Fast, Frank; Repashy, Allen. (2003). Rhacodactylus - The Complete Guide to their Selection and Care. Vista, California: Advanced Vision Inc. 296 pp. .

 
Geckos of New Caledonia
Lizard genera
Taxa named by Leopold Fitzinger